Dornin is the surname of:

 Bernard Dornin (1761-1836), the first publisher in the United States of distinctively Catholic books
 Robert Edson Dornin (1912-1982), United States Navy captain and World War II submarine commander
 Thomas Aloysius Dornin (1800-1874), United States Navy commodore